The falus was a bronze/copper currency of Morocco.

Identification
They are typically denominated by size rather than by inscription, and can be difficult to identify precisely.

Depreciation
From 1862, the falus was allowed to float, while the exchange rate for the silver dirham was fixed: this resulted in currency speculation and depreciation, with effectively two parallel currencies.

References

See also

 Fils (currency)

Economic history of Morocco
Currencies of Africa
Numismatics
Coins of Morocco
17th-century establishments in Morocco
20th-century disestablishments in Morocco
Currencies of Morocco